Latvia competed at the 2022 Winter Paralympics in Beijing, China which took place between 4–13 March 2022.

Competitors
The following is the list of number of competitors participating at the Games per sport/discipline.

Wheelchair curling

Latvia competed in wheelchair curling.

Summary

Round robin

Draw 2
Saturday, 5 March, 19:35

Draw 4
Sunday, 6 March, 14:35

Draw 5
Sunday, 6 March, 19:35

Draw 6
Monday, 7 March, 9:35

Draw 7
Monday, 7 March, 14:35

Draw 9
Monday, 8 March, 9:35

Draw 10
Tuesday, 8 March, 14:35

Draw 14
Wednesday, 9 March, 19:35

Draw 16
Thursday, 10 March, 14:35

Draw 17
Thursday, 10 March, 19:35

See also
Latvia at the Paralympics
Latvia at the 2022 Winter Olympics

References

Nations at the 2022 Winter Paralympics
2022
Winter Paralympics